Proapteryx micromeros is an extinct kiwi known from the 16–19 million-year-old early Miocene sediments of the St Bathans Fauna of Otago, New Zealand.

Features
P. micromeros is considerably smaller than modern kiwis, weighing around 234.1 – 377g (the smallest living kiwi, Apteryx owenii, weighs at least 800 g), and its more gracile otic process may indicate a shorter bill. It bears distinctively slender hindlimbs, more comparable in terms of proportion to flying birds like the banded rail than to extant kiwis, and it is speculated to have been capable of powered flight, or to have evolved relatively recently from flying ancestors.

Importance
The fact that Proapteryx lacked specialisation for a terrestrial, flightless lifestyle supports the hypothesis that kiwi ancestors flew to New Zealand from Australia in the Miocene, well after moas had developed their modern forms – moa remains are also known from Saint Bathans, already large and flightless. This supports genetic and morphological analyses indicating that the two clades arrived in New Zealand independently and are not particularly closely related, moas forming a clade with tinamous, and kiwis with Australian ratites, the cassowary and emu.

Kiwis have also been found by molecular studies to be the sister taxa of the elephant birds of Madagascar. Proapteryx establishes the existence of flying Australian palaeognaths as recently as the early Miocene, indicating that the Malagasy ratites may have flown across the Indian Ocean around this time.

References

Paleognathae
Ratites
Miocene birds
Fossils of New Zealand
Birds of the South Island
Extinct birds of New Zealand
Endemic fauna of New Zealand
Fossil taxa described in 2013
Extinct monotypic bird genera
Endemic birds of New Zealand